The Obrimini are the most species-rich tribe of the Phasmatodea family of the Heteropterygidae native to Southeast Asia.

Description 
The Obrimini differ from their sister tribe the Hoplocloniini by the structure of the secondary ovipositor at the abdomen of the females, which surrounds the actual ovipositor. It is formed in the Obrimini dorsally from the eleventh abdominal tergum called supraanal plate or epiproct, while in the Hoplocloniini it originated from the tenth tergum.

Distribution area 
The distribution area of the Obrimini extends from Borneo to the east and includes the Philippines, Sulawesi, most of the Moluccas and New Guinea. Farthest east lies with Viti Levu, the main island of the Fiji group, the distribution area of Pterobrimus depressus.

Taxonomy 

Brunner von Wattenwyl built in 1893 for the genera already described Obrimus, Hoploclonia, Tisamenus, Pylaemenes, Dares and Datames (today a synonym to Pylaemenes) the tribe Obrimini (abbreviated there as Obrimi.). He placed these together with the genus Heteropteryx and the South American tribe Cladomorphini (abbreviated there as Cladomorphi.) in the family Cladomorphidae (now synonymous with Cladomorphinae). In the following years, basesd on this work, mostly genera of today's Obriminae and Dataminae were listed in this tribe, for example by Josef Redtenbacher in 1906. Lawrence Bruner raised the Obrimini to the rank of a family in 1915. James Abram Garfield Rehn and his son John William Holman Rehn divided the Obriminae, which they only referred to as a subfamily, into the tribes Obrimini and Datamini in 1939. Both tribes were transferred in 1953 by Klaus Günther to the subfamily Heteropteryginae. In 2004 Oliver Zompro raised this subfamily to the rank of family and the tribes contained in the rank of subfamilies or in the rank of a separate family (Anisacanthidae). At the same time he built three tribes in the subfamily Obriminae. In addition to the Obrimini, these were the Miroceramiini and the Eubulidini. The latter was in 2016 by Frank H. Hennemann et al synonymized with the Obrimini. At the same time, the new tribe Tisamenini was established within the Obriminae. In a study based on genetic analysis, published in 2021, Sarah Bank et al synonymized the tribe Miroceramiini and the tribe Tisamenini with the Obrimini and placed next to this the Hoplocloniini as the only other tribe in the subfamily Obriminae. In addition, a species previously referred to as Trachyaretaon sp. 'Negros' was identified as a representative of an as yet undescribed genus.

Genera

References

External links

Phasmatodea
Phasmatodea tribes